The Fountain of Cybele (Spanish: Fuente de Cibeles, or simply, La Cibeles) is a neoclassical fountain in Madrid, Spain. It lies on the centre of the Plaza de Cibeles. The sculptural group in its centre represents Cybele, a Phrygian earth and fertility deity. It has become one of the icons of the city.

History and description 

Crowned by a mural crown, the goddess rides a chariot pulled by two lions, representing Atalanta and Hippomenes.

It was moved to its current location and orientation in 1895.

It has a maximum water capacity of 278 m3.

The fountain is the site where Real Madrid's supporters and players gather to celebrate the team's trophies as well as partakers of the successes of the Spain national football team. The goddess lost a hand in 1994, following a celebration of a victory of the Spanish national team. The goddess lost again one of her hands on 21 September 2002.

The Fountain of Cybele has a replica, the namesake Fuente de Cibeles, located in Mexico City and inaugurated in 1980.

References 
Citations

Bibliography
 
 
 

Sculptures of classical mythology
Fountains in Madrid
1780 sculptures
Outdoor sculptures in Madrid
Sculptures of lions
Neoclassical sculptures
Buildings and structures in Jerónimos neighborhood, Madrid
Sculptures of goddesses